Paulovits's game is a chess variant on a 10×10 chess board, designed by István Paulovits, around 1890. It was described in the book Dames de Paulovits and in the Classified Encyclopedia of Chess Variants (2007). Paulovits's game differs from western chess in that two new ranks are introduced in between the armies and two new files in between the queen's bishop and the queen. The new files hold respectively a pasha and a general with a pawn in front. The general and pasha both have about the same value as a rook.

Rules
The pasha jumps one or two squares in all eight orthogonal and diagonal directions and is thus a bit like a very short queen which can leap over other pieces. The general has the moves of a mann and a camel, that is it can jump to the eight adjacent squares or to the opposite corner of a 2×4 rectangle. Pawns can make an initial three-step move and a king castles by moving either two squares king-side or four squares queen-side.

References
 Paulovits's Game
 Classified Encyclopedia of Chess Variants (2007)

Abstract strategy games
Chess variants